Michael Perkins is an American politician from Maine. A Republican, Perkins has represented the 77th district in the Maine House of Representatives since 2016. He has worked as a police officer and small business owner. In June 2021, Perkins declared his candidacy for the 2022 election in Maine's 2nd congressional district. He dropped out of the race in December 2021, citing a recent battle with COVID-19.

References

External links
Office website
Profile at Ballotpedia

Living people
21st-century American politicians
People from Oakland, Maine
Republican Party members of the Maine House of Representatives
Year of birth missing (living people)